Mark Baker (born 8 April 1959 in London) is an English animator and producer whose works include the Oscar-nominated short films The Hill Farm (1988), The Village (1993) and Jolly Roger (1998). He is also known for co-creating Peppa Pig (2004–present) and Ben & Holly's Little Kingdom (2009-2013).

Information
A contemporary of Nick Park at the National Film and Television School in London, Mark Baker now works for Astley Baker Davies. His films, The Hill Farm and Jolly Roger and The Village, were included in the Animation Show of Shows. Through his career, Baker has received Oscar nominations for his works of animated short films. He emerged as an animator in the 1970s. He is known to draw in a childlike style, but the underlying meanings of his work represent a sophisticated world view. His film The Hill Farm (1988) received an Oscar nomination, a BAFTA, the Grand Prix at the Annecy Animation Festival, the praise of the Russian animator Yuri Norstein, and others. Baker completed The Village for Channel 4 in 1993. In 1994, Baker partnered with Neville Astley to create the production company of Astley Baker that was later changed to the name of Astley Baker Davies with the addition of producer Phil Davies. In 2003 he participated in Kihachirō Kawamoto's collaborative project Winter Days. His most popular animation that he is recently known for Peppa Pig.

Background
Mark Baker was born in London on 8 April 1959. In his teen years, Baker began to make animated films on 8 mm. Then he continued to study animation at the West Surrey College of Art and Design (now University for the Creative Arts) where he created the short film The Three Knights (1982). He then continued on in his career by animating television commercials for the duration of a year for Richard Purdum Productions. Baker then enrolled in the National Film and Television School where he created his short film The Hill Farm (1988). He graduated in 1989 and then worked as a freelance animator and director for various companies including TVC, Speedy Films, David Anderson Films and Pizazz Pictures.

Preservation
The Academy Film Archive has preserved several of Mark Baker's films, including Jolly Roger, The Hill Farm, and The Village.

References

External links
Astley Baker Davies website, including information about The Hill Farm, Jolly Roger and other animations.

The Village on YouTube
The Hill Farm excerpt on Vimeo
The Hill Farm in its entirety on YouTube
Jolly Roger on YouTube and excerpt on Vimeo
The Village excerpt on Vimeo

1959 births
Baker, Mark
Baker, Mark
Baker, Mark